Frederick Adams may refer to:

Fred A. Adams (1882–1941), American politician
Frederick Baldwin Adams (1878–1961), American businessman and philanthropist
Frederick Baldwin Adams Jr. (1910–2001), director of the Pierpont Morgan Library
Frederick Upham Adams (1859–1921), inventor and author
Frederick W. Adams (1786–1858), physician and author of theological books from Pawlet, Vermont
Frederick Adams (boxer), British boxer
Frederick Adams (planner), son of the architect, Thomas Adams, first department head for urban planning at the Massachusetts Institute of Technology
Fred Adams (born 1961), American astrophysicist

See also
Frederick Adam (disambiguation)